"A Sweet Old Fashioned Girl" is a song written by Bob Merrill.  The song was produced by Dick Jacobs,
and performed by Teresa Brewer. It reached #3 in the UK and #7 in the U.S. in 1956. The song was ranked #46 on Billboard magazine's Top 50 singles of 1956.

Other versions
Billie Anthony and Eric Jupp and His Orchestra released a version of the song as a single in 1956, but it did not chart.
Terry-Thomas with His Rock 'N' Roll Rotters released a version of the song entitled "A Sweet Old-Fashioned Boy" as a single in 1956, but it did not chart.

References

1956 songs
1956 singles
Songs written by Bob Merrill
Teresa Brewer songs
Coral Records singles
Columbia Records singles
Decca Records singles